Sminthidae is a family of mouse-like jumping rodents. They are represented by only one extant genus, Sicista, represented by 19 species found throughout most of Eurasia, from central Europe east to Siberia, and south to southern China. However, they were much more diverse and had a much wider range in prehistoric times, having multiple genera and being found not only in Eurasia but also throughout North America, where they existed up to the early Pleistocene. They have a well-attested fossil record which dates as far back as the early Oligocene.

They were formerly classified as the subfamily Sicistinae in the family Dipodidae alongside the jerboas and jumping mice, but phylogenetic evidence supports all three of these belonging to distinct families, thus leaving only the jerboas in Dipodidae.

Extant species 

 Genus Sicista
 Armenian birch mouse Sicista armenica
 Northern birch mouse, Sicista betulina
 Caucasian birch mouse, Sicista caucasica
 Long-tailed birch mouse, Sicista caudata
 Tsimlyansk birch mouse, Sicista cimlanica
 Chinese birch mouse, Sicista concolor
 Kazbeg birch mouse, Sicista kazbegica
 Kluchor birch mouse, Sicista kluchorica
 Nordmann's birch mouse, Sicista loriger
 Altai birch mouse, Sicista napaea
 Gray birch mouse, Sicista pseudonapaea
 Severtzov's birch mouse, Sicista severtzovi
 Strand's birch mouse, Sicista strandi
 Southern birch mouse, Sicista subtilis
 Talgar birch mouse, Sicista talgarica
 Terskey birch mouse, Sicista terskeica
 Tien Shan birch mouse, Sicista tianshanica
 Hungarian birch mouse, Sicista trizona
 Zhetysu birch mouse, Sicista zhetysuica

Extinct genera 
These extinct genera are definitively known:

 Genus †Allosminthus 
 Genus †Heosminthus
 Genus †Heterosminthus
 Genus †Gobiosminthus
 Genus †Lophocricetus
 Genus †Macrognathomys
 Genus †Megasminthus
 Genus †Miosicista
 Genus †Parasminthus
 Genus †Plesiosminthus
 Genus †Schaubemys
 Genus †Shamosminthus
 Genus †Sinosminthus
 Genus †Tyrannomys

The Eocene genera Primisminthus and Banyuesminthus could represent even older members of Sminthidae, although other studies speculate that they may be basal dipodoids.

References 

Sminthidae
Rodent families
Dipodoid rodents
Extant Oligocene first appearances
Taxa named by Johann Friedrich von Brandt